Directive 98/71/EC of the European Parliament and of the Council of 13 October 1998 on the legal protection of designs 
is a European Union directive in the field of industrial design rights, made under the internal market 
provisions of the Treaty of Rome. It sets harmonised standards for eligibility and protection of most types of 
registered design.

Eligible designs 
A design is defined as "the appearance of the whole or a part of a product resulting from the features of, in particular, 
the lines, contours, colours, shape, texture and/or materials of the product itself and/or its ornamentation" (Art. 2). 
Designs may be protected if:
they are novel, that is if no identical design has been made available to the public;
they have individual character, that is the "informed user" would find it different from other designs which are available to the public.
Where a design forms part of a more complex product, the novelty and individual character of the design are judged on the part 
of the design which is visible during normal use.

Designs are not protected insofar as their appearance is wholly determined by their technical function, or by the need to 
interconnect with other products to perform a technical function (the "must-fit" exception). However modular systems such as 
Lego or Mechano may be protected [Art. 8(3)].

Design right protection 
The holder of a registered design right has the exclusive right to authorise or prohibit others from using the design in any 
way, notably by producing, importing, selling or using products based on the design. However, rightholders may not prevent 
private and non-commercial use, use for research or use for teaching. There is also an exception for foreign-registered ships 
and aeroplanes, based on the principles of maritime sovereignty.

Protection under a registered design right last initially for one or more periods of five years, and may be renewed up to a 
maximum total of twenty-five years. In respect of a given product, they are exhausted when it is sold with the consent of the 
rightholder (the first-sale doctrine).

Protection by a registered design right does not affect any other intellectual property rights in the product, notably 
unregistered design rights, patents and trade marks. The question of copyright protection is left to the 
laws of the Member States, which apply varying criteria of originality to the copyright protection of "applied art"; the point, however, is that the existence of the registered design right does not stop the design also being eligible for copyright protection.

Implementation

Review 
The Directive leaves the question of component parts mostly without harmonisation, given the widely varying practices between 
Member States.

See also 
Industrial design rights in the European Union
Community design

External links 
Text of directive with metadata

Legal protection of designs
Industrial design
Intellectual property law of the European Union
1998 in law
1998 in the European Union